Black Creek is an unincorporated community in Bryan County, Georgia, United States. Black Creek is the location of the arms manufacturer Daniel Defense, as well as the fishing bait company Black Creek Baitz,.

History

On April 5, 2022, the town was hit by a violent EF4 tornado, which heavily damaged or completely destroyed multiple homes, mobile homes, and other structures while producing widespread damage to trees, power lines, and power poles. One person was killed and twelve others were injured.

References

Unincorporated communities in Georgia (U.S. state)
Unincorporated communities in Bryan County, Georgia